The State Flag of the Union of Soviet Socialist Republics, commonly known as the Soviet flag, was the official state flag of the Union of Soviet Socialist Republics (USSR) from 1922 to 1991. The flag's design and symbolism are derived from several sources, but emerged during the Russian Revolution. The flag is also an international symbol of the communist movement as a whole.

The design is a solid field of red adorned with a unique gold emblem in the upper hoist quarter. The red flag was a traditional revolutionary symbol long before 1917, and its incorporation into the flag paid tribute to the international aspect of workers' revolution. The hammer and sickle design was a modern industrial touch adopted from the Russian Revolution. The union of the hammer (workers) and the sickle (peasants) represents the "victorious and enduring revolutionary alliance". The emblem is topped by a gold-bordered red star representing the Communist Party of the Soviet Union.

The first flag was adopted in December 1922. In 1923, 1924, 1936 and 1955, a statute on the flag was adopted which resulted in a change of the hammer's handle length and the shape of the sickle. In 1980, an amendment was made to the 1955 decree which removed the hammer and sickle on the reverse side of the flag, the legal description remained completely unchanged. The design of the 1955 Soviet flag has served as the basis for all the Soviet republic flags.

Symbolism and design
The flag of the Soviet Union consisted of a plain red flag with a gold hammer crossed with a gold sickle placed beneath a gold-bordered red star. This symbol is in the upper left canton of the red flag.

The colour red honours the red flag of the Paris Commune of 1871 and the red star and hammer and sickle are symbols of communism and socialism.

The hammer symbolises urban industrial workers while the sickle symbolises agricultural workers (peasants)—who together, as the Proletarian class, form the state.  The red star represents the Communist Party, and its position over the hammer and sickle symbolises its leading role in socialist society to unify and enlighten the workers and peasants in the building of communism.

The flag's design was legislated in 1955, which gave a clear way to define and create the flag. This resulted in a change of the hammer's handle length and the shape of the sickle.  The adopted statute stated that:
The ratio of width to length of the flag is 1:2.
The sharp tip of the sickle lies in the center of the upper side of the square, and the handles of the hammer and sickle rest in the bottom corners of the square.

Officially since 1980, the reverse side of the flag was a plain red field without the hammer and sickle. In practice however, this was very commonly disregarded by flag makers as it was far easier and less costly to simply print the flag through and through, with the obverse design mirrored on the reverse. It was also common to see the reverse of the flag bear the hammer and sickle in the obverse formation. An example of the flag demonstrating its de jure status as being only one-sided is that of the Soviet flag atop the Moscow Kremlin which bore the single-side official design.

For vertical display, the flag was made with the distinct difference of having the hammer and sickle rotated 90 degrees in order to compensate for the change in dimensions. This was common in official practice, however the common flag owner would simply hang the standard design of the flag by the hoist.

History
During the establishment of the Russian Soviet Republic, Vladimir Lenin and his followers had considered the inclusion of a sword symbol in addition to the hammer and sickle as part of the state seal on which the flag was eventually based.  The idea was dismissed as too visually aggressive, with Lenin apparently affirming, "A sword is not one of our symbols."

The first official flag was adopted in December 1922 at the First Congress of Soviets of the USSR.  It was agreed that the red banner "was transformed from the symbol of the Party to the symbol of a state, and around that flag gathered the peoples of the soviet republics to unite into one state — the Union of Soviet Socialist Republics".  On 30 December 1922, the Congress adopted a Declaration and Agreement on the establishment of the USSR.  Article 22 of the Agreement states: "The USSR has a flag, coat of arms and a state seal."  The description of the first flag was given in the 1924 Soviet Constitution, accepted in the second session of the executive committee (CIK) of the USSR on 6 July 1923.  The text of article 71 states: "The state flag of the Union of Soviet Socialist Republics consists of a red or scarlet field with states coat of arms." It was ordered with the unusual ratio of 4:1 in proportion and consisted of a red flag with the state coat of arms in the center.  However, such a flag was never mass-produced.  This flag was the official flag for four months, and was replaced as the official flag by the more familiar hammer and sickle design during the third session of the CIK of the USSR on 12 November 1923.

In the third session of the CIK of the USSR, the description of Soviet flag in the Constitution was changed, and article 71 was edited to read: "The state flag of the Union of Soviet Socialist Republics consists of a red or scarlet field, and in the canton a golden sickle and hammer, and a red five-pointed star bordered in gold above them.  The ratio of width to length is 1:2."  On 19 August 1955, the Statute on the State Flag of the Union of Soviet Socialist Republics was adopted by a decision of the Presidium of the Supreme Soviet of the USSR.  This resulted in a change of the hammer's handle length and the shape of the sickle. On 15 August 1980, a new edition of the Statute on the State Flag of the Union of Soviet Socialist Republics was adopted, which did not make any changes to the flag's description aside from removing the hammer and sickle on the reverse side of the flag. From this point on, the flag stayed in use with this design until the disintegration of the USSR on 26 December 1991, at which time it ceased to be a national flag and replaced by national flags of the post-Soviet republics.

On 15 April 1996 Boris Yeltsin signed a presidential decree giving the Soviet flag (called the Victory Banner, after the banner that was raised above the Reichstag on 1 May 1945) status similar to that of the national flag. The hammer and sickle were removed from the flag, leaving only the star, but they were reinstated later. On certain holidays, the Victory Banner is flown along with the Russian flag.

Contemporary usage 
In current times, the Soviet national flag (and similar flags) are widely used by those on the political far left, most often by those who support Marxism–Leninism.

The Soviet flag is also actively promoted in Russia as a symbol of nostalgia for the Soviet Union. Various politicians frequently utilize it as a symbol of the superpower status Russia lost in 1991.

Amidst the backdrop of the 2022 Russian invasion of Ukraine, the Communist Party of the Russian Federation proposed to the State Duma the adoption of the Soviet flag as the official flag of Russia on April 19, 2022. The use of Soviet symbols including its flag became very extensive by invading Russian foces over the course of the war along with the letter "Z".

Similarities with other flags

The Soviet Union was the world's first constitutionally socialist state, making it the inspiration of future socialist states.  This led to the inspirations for the flags of the Republic of Angola, the Republic of Mozambique, the People's Republic of China, the Democratic People's Republic of Korea, and the Socialist Republic of Vietnam.

Derivatives from the Soviet flag 
The flags of the Soviet republics that constituted the USSR and the Victory Banner were all defaced or modified versions of the Soviet flag.

Gallery

See also
Communist symbolism
Flag of Russia
Flags of the Soviet Republics
Flags whose reverse differs from the obverse
Hammer and sickle
Red flag
Red star
State Emblem of the Soviet Union

Notes

References

External links

Flags of the Soviet Union
National symbols of the Soviet Union
Soviet Union
1923 establishments in the Soviet Union
Soviet Union